Funt may refer to:

 Funt (mass), an obsolete Russian unit equivalent to a pound
 Allen Funt (1914–1999), American producer-director and creator of Candid Camera
 Peter Funt, son of Allen Funt, current host of Candid Camera
 Sitz-Chairman Funt, a fictional character from the novel The Little Golden Calf